The 2008 BWF Grand Prix Gold and Grand Prix was the second season of BWF Grand Prix Gold and Grand Prix with fourteen tournaments in contested. The season started with German Open in February and ended with Vietnam Open in December.

Schedule
Below is the schedule released by Badminton World Federation:

Results

Winners

Performance by country
Tabulated below are the Grand Prix performances based on countries. Only countries who have won a title are listed:

Grand Prix Gold
India Open
April 1–6, Kotla Vijay Bhaskar Reddy Indoor Stadium, Hyderabad, India.

Thailand Open
June 24–29, Nimibutr Stadium, Bangkok, Thailand.

Chinese Taipei Open
September 9–14, Taipei County Shinjuang Stadium, Taipei, Republic of China (Taiwan)

Macau Open
September 30–October 5, Tap Seac Multi-sports Pavilion, Macau.

Grand Prix
German Open
February 26–March 2, RWE Rhein-Ruhr Sporthalle, Mülheim, Germany.

U.S. Open
July 8–13, Orange County Badminton Club, Orange, California, United States.

Bitburger Open
September 30–October 5, Saarlandhalle, Saarbrücken, Germany.

Bulgaria Open
October 7–12, Sofia Hall, Sofia, Bulgaria.

Dutch Open
October 14–19, Topsportcentrum, Almere, Netherlands.

Russian Open
November 4–9, Druzhba Multipurpose Arena, Moscow, Russia.

New Zealand Open
November 11–16, North Shore Events Centre, Auckland, New Zealand.

Vietnam Open
December 2–7, Phan Dinh Phung Stadium, Ho Chi Minh City, Vietnam

References

Bwf Grand Prix Gold And Grand Prix, 2008
BWF Grand Prix Gold and Grand Prix